Badminton Association of Thailand (BAT), officially known as Badminton Association of Thailand Under Royal Patronage of His Majesty the King is the national governing body for the sport of badminton in Thailand. As of January 2019, there are 52 affiliated clubs and 304 associate member clubs across the country.

History
The association was founded by four badminton enthusiasts in Thailand in 1950 and joined the International Badminton Federation a year later. It was awarded royal patronage in 1954 by King Bhumibol Adulyadej, who was also an avid badminton player. Long time support and contributions from the king was honored by Badminton World Federation in 2012 when former president Kang Young Joong awarded BWF President's Medal to the king.

List of presidents
The following is the list of presidents of the association since 1950.

Tournaments
 Thailand Open, an annual open tournament that attracts the world's elite players.
 Princess Sirivannavari Thailand Masters, a new tournament created in 2016 to honor Princess Sirivannavari Nariratana who is an ex-badminton player herself.

References

National members of the Badminton World Federation
Badminton in Thailand
Organizations based in Thailand under royal patronage
Badminton
1950 establishments in Thailand